Viktor Vladislavovich Eisymont (20 December 1904 – 31 January 1964) was a Soviet film director. He was a three-time recipient of the Stalin Prize, in 1942, 1947, and 1951.

Filmography
 Friends  (1938); co-directed with Lev Arnshtam
 The Fourth Periscope  (Четвертый перископ) (1939)
 The Girl from Leningrad  (Фронтовые подруги) (1941)
 Once There Was a Girl  (Жила-была девочка) (1944)
 Cruiser 'Varyag'  (Крейсер «Варяг») (1946)
 Alexander Popov (Александр Попов) (1949); co-directed with Gerbert Rappaport
 Lights on the River (Огни на реке) (1953)
 Two Friends (Два друга) (1954)
 Lights on the River (Огни на реке) (1954)
 The Drummer's Fate (Судьба барабанщика) (1955)
 Good Luck! (В добрый час!) (1956)
 Buddy (Дружок) (1958)
 The Adventures of Tolya Klyukvin (Приключения Толи Клюквина) (1964)
 The End of Old Beryozovka (Конец старой Берёзовки) (1960)
 Unusual Town (Необыкновенный город) (1962)

References

External links

1904 births
1964 deaths
People from Grodno
Soviet film directors
Belarusian film directors
Stalin Prize winners
Burials at Novodevichy Cemetery
Communist Party of the Soviet Union members
Socialist realist artists